The May Bumps 1974 were a set of rowing races held at Cambridge University in June 1974. The event was run as a bumps race and was the 83rd set of races in the series of May Bumps which have been held annually in mid-June since 1887. In 1974, women's crews competed for the first time, although unlike the men's eights, they competed in fours. A total of 149 crews took part (137 men's crews and 12 women's crews), with around 1200 participants in total.

Head of the River crews

 Lady Margaret men bumped Jesus and First and Third to take the headship for the tenth time.

 Clare women rowed over in the inaugural women's event to take the headship.

Highest 2nd boats

 Lady Margaret 2nd men rose six places to be the highest placed second boat.

 The highest women's 2nd crew was Newnham II, finished in third behind the first boat.

Links to Races in Other Years

Bumps Charts

Below are the bumps charts for the men's and women's 1st divisions. The men's bumps charts are on the left, and women's bumps charts on the right. The bumps chart represents the progress of every crew over all four days of the racing. To follow the progress of any particular crew, simply find the crew's name on the left side of the chart and follow the line to the end-of-the-week finishing position on the right of the chart.

May Bumps results
1974 in English sport
1974 in rowing